Socrates Mountain is a summit in Pendleton County, West Virginia, in the United States.

The mountain was named for Socrates, the ancient Greek philosopher.

References

Mountains of Pendleton County, West Virginia
Mountains of West Virginia